Vonhof is a German surname. Notable people with the surname include:

 Fritz Vonhof (1907–?), German bobsledder
 Peter Vonhof (born 1949), German cyclist

See also
 Von Hoff

German-language surnames